Heinz Hanus (24 May 1882 – 16 March 1972) was an Austrian actor and film director. He directed 21 films between 1908 and 1929. His younger brother was actor and film director Emmerich Hanus.

Selected filmography
 Der Gevatter Tod (Godfather Death) (1921)
 William Ratcliff (1922)
 The Arsonists of Europe (1926)
 A Precocious Girl (1934)

References

External links

1882 births
1972 deaths
Austrian male film actors
Austrian film directors
20th-century Austrian male actors
Film people from Vienna
Austrian male silent film actors